Yarala is a genus of fossil mammals that resemble contemporary bandicoots. The superfamily Yaraloidea and family Yaralidae were created following the discovery of the type species Yarala burchfieldi in 1995, on the basis that it lacks synapomorphies that unite all other peramelemorphian taxa.

A second species was described in 2006, which is suggested to be ancestral
to Y. burchfieldi.

References

Peramelemorphs
Oligocene mammals of Australia
Miocene mammals of Australia
Oligocene marsupials
Miocene marsupials
Riversleigh fauna
Oligocene genus first appearances
Miocene genus extinctions
Fossil taxa described in 2000
Prehistoric marsupial genera